Glenn Ross (born 1964) is a Falkland Islands engineer and politician who served as a Member of the Legislative Assembly for the Stanley constituency from the 2009 general election until his resignation in 2011.

In 1979 Ross became an apprentice electrician, he then went on to study at the University of Southampton and New College Durham, becoming a Chartered Engineer in 2006. He married Jan in 1985 with whom he has two daughters. In April 2011 Ross resigned from the Legislative Assembly in order to concentrate on his work at the islands' power station. His seat on the Assembly was filled by Mike Summers in a by-election on 23 June 2011.

References

1964 births
Living people
Alumni of the University of Southampton
Falkland Islands MLAs 2009–2013
People from Stanley, Falkland Islands
Falkland Islands women in politics